Picket Piece is a small village in the Test Valley district of Hampshire, England. Andover lies approximately 2 miles (3.2 km) south-west from the village.

The village has expanded rapidly since 2015 with several new roads and house building. In October 2017 Test Valley Council approved another 520 homes to be built in the village.

There is one church in the village. It started as the Harroway Mission. It is named after the Whitchurch to Andover road (part of the Harrow Way) that ran through Picket Piece to Andover. When the Walworth Industrial Estate was built in the 1960s, that stretch of the road was renamed Walworth Road.

The Mission was built by the Congregational (now the United Reformed Church) in Andover.  It last appeared in the United Reformed Church yearbook in 2001.

External links
Picket Piece Village Hall

References

Villages in Hampshire
Test Valley